Ashley Cameron Church (born 26 February 1964) is a New Zealand business executive, commentator and former politician.

Early life
Church was born in Hastings and raised in Napier where he was educated at Tamatea High School.

Political career

In 1989 he became the youngest person ever elected to Napier City Council. During his time on the council he attracted both strong support and strong opposition for his views. He was responsible for the ‘NapierLife’ Marketing program, which was a key driver in reversing population decline and re-energising economic activity in Hawke's Bay during the 1990s. He lost his Council seat in 1998 after serving three terms.

Community activities
His community activity has included roles as National Council Member of New Zealand Jaycees, Executive Councillor of the North Shore Chamber of Commerce, National Board member of Towns & Cities New Zealand, Creator and Organiser of the Hawke's Bay Summer Festival, and Organiser of the 1985 North Shore Telethon Centre. 
He has been a Director of the Hawke's Bay Airport, Marineland of New Zealand and the National Aquarium of New Zealand.

Work history
Church was Chief Executive Officer of the Auckland Property Investors Association from 2005 to 2007 but left under a legal cloud. He was National Sales Manager for Mercury Energy, then Sales and Marketing Manager of Pulse Energy from 2009. He was general manager of the Newmarket Business Association from 2010 to 2014, then the CEO of the Property Institute of New Zealand from 2015.

He is employed by NZME as a correspondent, is a commentator on energy and business issues, and has appeared on My House My Castle, NZ Open Home, ASB I Want to Buy a Home and TVNZ Breakfast. He is a director of the Israel Institute of NZ and has a business partnership with media expert Rawdon Christie. He also provides consulting and management services to membership organisations, associations and business co-operatives. He was chairperson of the New Zealand Taxpayers' Union for five months in 2021.

Notes

References

1964 births
Living people
People from Hastings, New Zealand
People from Napier, New Zealand
Napier City Councillors
New Zealand National Party politicians
Unsuccessful candidates in the 1987 New Zealand general election